Jawatha Mosque, also incorrectly spelled Al-Jawan, is located in the Jawāthā, about  northeast of Hofuf, Al-Ahsa, Saudi Arabia. It was the earliest known mosque built in eastern Arabia, and most of the original structure is in ruins. Nevertheless, the site is still used for prayer.

Construction

Sources give the date of the mosque's original construction as either 628 CE (7 AH) or 635-636 CE. It was built at the hands of the Bani Abd al-Qays tribe, which lived there before and during the early Islamic period. This mosque is believed to be the first mosque built in Eastern Province and where the second Friday congregation prayer in Islam was offered, the first being held in the Prophet's Mosque in Medina. According to legend, when the Hajr Al-Aswad (Black Stone) was stolen from Mecca by the Qarmatians, it was kept in this mosque for nearly 22 years.

Most of the mosque's original structure has been lost and it remains in danger of collapse. Only a small number of its arches from the historic mosque today, probably dating from around the 9th century AD. These remains include two pointed keel arches from one arcade of the mosque and a part of the qibla wall consisting of three keel-arch niches. The central niche of the qibla wall is larger than the other two and acts as the mihrab, which projects from the outer side of the wall. In modern times, sometime before 1983, these remains were cleared of sand and enclosed by a structure of concrete walls and covered with a protective roof, which remains today.

See also

Al-Ahsa Oasis
Old mosques in Eurasia
 List of mosques in Saudi Arabia
 Lists of mosques

References 

7th-century mosques
Mosques in Saudi Arabia
History of Saudi Arabia
Eastern Province, Saudi Arabia
Mosques completed in 629